The Roman Constitution was an uncodified set of guidelines and principles passed down mainly through precedent. The Roman constitution was not formal or even official, largely unwritten and constantly evolving. Having those characteristics, it was therefore more like the British and United States common law system than a sovereign law system like the English Constitutions of Clarendon and Great Charter or the United States Constitution, even though the constitution's evolution through the years was often directed by passage of new laws and repeal of older ones.

Concepts that originated in the Roman constitution live on in both forms of government to this day. Examples include checks and balances, the separation of powers, vetoes, filibusters, quorum requirements, term limits, impeachments, the powers of the purse, and regularly scheduled elections. Even some lesser used modern constitutional concepts, such as the bloc voting found in the electoral college of the United States, originate from ideas found in the Roman constitution.

Over the years, the Roman constitution continuously evolved. By the late 5th century BC, the Constitution of the Roman Kingdom had given way to the Constitution of the Roman Republic. By 27 BC, the Constitution of the Roman Republic had transformed into the Constitution of the Roman Empire. By 300 AD, the Constitution of the Roman Empire had been reformed into the Constitution of the Late Roman Empire. The actual changes, however, were quite gradual. Together, these four constitutions formed four epochs in the continuous evolution of one master constitution.

Legislative assemblies

The first Roman assembly, the comitia curiata, was founded during the early kingdom. Its only political role was to elect new kings. Sometimes, the king would submit his decrees to it for ratification. In the early years of the Republic, the comitia curiata was the only legislative assembly with any power. Shortly after the founding of the Republic, however, the comitia centuriata and the comitia populi tributa became the predominant elective and legislative assemblies.

Most modern legislative assemblies are bodies consisting of elected representatives. Their members typically propose and debate bills. These modern assemblies use a form of representative democracy. In contrast, the assemblies of the Roman Republic used a form of direct democracy. The Roman assemblies were bodies of ordinary citizens, rather than elected representatives. In this regard, bills voted on (called plebiscites) were similar to modern popular referendums.

Unlike many modern assemblies, Roman assemblies were not bicameral. That is to say that bills did not have to pass both major assemblies in order to be enacted into law. In addition, no other branch had to ratify a bill (rogatio) in order for it to become law (lex). Members also had no authority to introduce bills for consideration; only executive magistrates could introduce new bills. This arrangement is also similar to what is found in many modern countries. Usually, ordinary citizens cannot propose new laws for their enactment by a popular election. Unlike many modern assemblies, in the early Republic, the Roman assemblies also had judicial functions.

After the founding of the empire, the vast majority of the powers of the assemblies were transferred to the Roman Senate. When the Senate elected magistrates, the results of those elections would be read to the assemblies. Occasionally, the emperor would submit laws to the comitia tributa for ratification. The assemblies ratified laws up until the reign of the Emperor Domitian. After this point, the assemblies simply served as vehicles through which citizens would organize.

Senate

The Roman Senate was the most permanent of all of Rome's political institutions. It was probably founded before the first king of Rome ascended the throne. It survived the fall of the Roman Kingdom in the late 5th century BC, the fall of the Roman Republic in 27 BC, and the fall of the Roman Empire in 476 AD. It was, in contrast to many modern institutions named 'Senate', not a legislative body, but rather, an advisory one. The power of the Senate waxed and waned throughout its history. During the days of the kingdom, it was little more than an advisory council to the king, though in the interregnum between monarchs, it elected the next king. The last king of Rome, Lucius Tarquinius Superbus, was overthrown following a coup d'état that was planned in the Senate.

During the early Republic, the Senate was politically weak. During these early years, the executive magistrates were quite powerful. The transition from monarchy to constitutional rule was probably more gradual than the legends suggest. Thus, it took a prolonged weakening of these executive magistrates before the Senate was able to assert its authority over those magistrates. By the middle Republic, the Senate reached the apex of its republican power. This occurred because of the convergence of two factors. The plebeians had recently achieved full political enfranchisement. Therefore, they were not as aggressive as they had been during the early Republic in pushing for radical reforms. 

The period was marked by prolonged warfare against foreign enemies. The result was that both the popular assemblies and the executive magistrates deferred to the collective wisdom of the Senate. The late Republic saw a decline in the Senate's power. This decline began following the reforms of the radical tribunes Tiberius and Gaius Gracchus. The declining influence of the Senate during this era, in large part, was caused by the class struggles that had dominated the early Republic. The end result was the overthrow of the Republic, and the creation of the Roman Empire.

The Senate of the very early Roman Empire was as weak as it had been during the late Republic. However, after the transition from republic to empire was complete, the Senate arguably held more power than it had held at any previous point. All constitutional powers, legislative, executive and judicial, had been transferred to the Senate. However, unlike the Senate of the Republic, the Senate of the Empire was dominated by the emperor. It was through the Senate that the emperor exercised his autocratic powers, and by the late Principate, the Senate's power had declined into near-irrelevance. It never again regained the power that it had held in the middle Republic.

Much of the surviving literature from the imperial period was written by senators. To a large degree, this demonstrates the strong cultural influence of the Senate, even during the late empire. The institution survived the fall of the Empire in the West, and even enjoyed a modest revival as imperial power was reduced to a government of Italy only. The senatorial class was severely affected by the Gothic wars.

Executive magistrates

During the years of the Roman Kingdom, the king (rex) was the only executive magistrate with any power. He was assisted by two quaestors, whom he appointed. He would often appoint other assistants for other tasks. When he died, an interrex would preside over the Senate and assemblies until a new king was elected.

Under the Constitution of the Roman Republic, the "executive branch" was composed of both ordinary as well as extraordinary magistrates. Each ordinary magistrate would be elected by one of the two major Legislative Assemblies of the Roman Republic. The principal extraordinary magistrate, the dictator, would be appointed upon authorization by the Senate of the Roman Republic. Most magistrates were elected annually for a term of one year. The terms for all annual offices would begin on New Year's Day, and end on the last day of December.

The two highest ranking ordinary magistrates, the consuls and praetors, held a type of authority called imperium (Latin for "command"). Imperium allowed a magistrate to command a military force. Consuls held a higher grade of imperium than praetors. Consuls and praetors, as well as censors and aediles, were regarded as "curule magistrates". They would sit on a curule chair, which was a symbol of state power. Consuls and praetors where attended by bodyguards called lictors. The lictors would carry fasces, which consisted of a rod with an embedded axe, symbols of the coercive power of the state. Quaestors were not curule magistrates, but rather, administrators and had little real power.

Plebeian tribunes were not officially "magistrates", since they were elected only by the plebeians. Since they were considered to be the embodiment of the people of Rome, their office and their person were considered sacrosanct. It was considered to be a capital offense to harm a tribune, to attempt to harm a tribune or to attempt to obstruct a tribune in any way. All other powers of the tribunate derived from this sacrosanctity, with two rights: intercession between magistrates and advocacy for the people. The tribunes were assisted by plebeian aediles.

In an emergency, a dictator would be selected by the Senate. A newly appointed dictator would usually select a deputy, known as the magister equitum ("Master of the Horse"). Both the dictator and magister equitum were extraordinary magistrates, and they both held imperium. In practice, the dictator functioned as a consul without any constitutional checks on his power. After 202 BC, the dictatorship fell into disuse, and during emergencies, the Senate would pass the senatus consultum ultimum ("ultimate decree of the Senate") which suspended civil government, and declared (something analogous to) martial law. It would declare "videant consules ne res publica detrimenti capiat" ("let the consuls see to it that the state suffer no harm"). In effect, the consuls would be vested with dictatorial powers.

After the establishment of the Principate, the old magistracies (consuls, praetors, censors, aediles, quaestors and tribunes) lost the majority of their actual powers, effectively being reduced to municipal officers in charge of various games and holidays. The vast majority of actual political and administrative work was transferred into the emperor. The founding of the empire was tantamount to a restoration of the old monarchy. The chief executive became the unchallenged power in the state, with overwhelming dominance of the Senate, which, while it as a body gained practically all authorities formerly held by the Assemblies, also became nothing more than a rubber stamp for the emperor.

Legacy
The Roman Constitution was one of the few constitutions to exist before the 18th century. Although the constitutions of Sparta and Carthage were drafted and utilised either on paper or by nature much of their existence is only known through secondary sources, and such constitutions are questioned in the book II of Aristotle's Politics. None of the others are as well known to us today, and none of the others governed such a vast empire for so long. Therefore, the Roman Constitution was used as a template, often the only one, when the first constitutions of the modern era were being drafted. Because of this, many modern constitutions have superstructures which are similar, or even identical (such as a separation of powers and checks and balances) to the Roman Constitution.

See also

 History of the Roman Constitution
 History of the Constitution of the Roman Kingdom
 History of the Constitution of the Roman Republic
 History of the Constitution of the Roman Empire
 History of the Constitution of the Late Roman Empire
 Constitutional reforms of Julius Caesar
 Constitutional reforms of Sulla

Notes

References

 Abbott, Frank Frost (1901). A History and Description of Roman Political Institutions. Elibron Classics.
 Byrd, Robert (1995). The Senate of the Roman Republic. U.S. Government Printing Office, Senate Document 103-23.
 Cicero, Marcus Tullius (1841). The Political Works of Marcus Tullius Cicero: Comprising his Treatise on the Commonwealth; and his Treatise on the Laws. Translated from the original, with Dissertations and Notes in Two Volumes. By Francis Barham, Esq. London: Edmund Spettigue. Vol. 1.
 Lintott, Andrew (1999). The Constitution of the Roman Republic. Oxford University Press.
 Polybius (1823). The General History of Polybius: Translated from the Greek. By James Hampton. Oxford: Printed by W. Baxter. Fifth Edition, Vol 2.
 Taylor, Lily Ross (1966). Roman Voting Assemblies: From the Hannibalic War to the Dictatorship of Caesar. The University of Michigan Press.

Further reading

 Ihne, Wilhelm. Researches Into the History of the Roman Constitution. William Pickering. 1853. 
 Johnston, Harold Whetstone. Orations and Letters of Cicero: With Historical Introduction, An Outline of the Roman Constitution, Notes, Vocabulary and Index. Scott, Foresman and Company. 1891.
 Mommsen, Theodor. Roman Constitutional Law. 1871-1888
 Tighe, Ambrose. The Development of the Roman Constitution. D. Apple & Co. 1886.
 Von Fritz, Kurt. The Theory of the Mixed Constitution in Antiquity. Columbia University Press, New York. 1975.
 The Histories by Polybius
 Cambridge Ancient History, Volumes 9–13.
 A. Cameron, The Later Roman Empire, (Fontana Press, 1993).
 M. Crawford, The Roman Republic, (Fontana Press, 1978).
 E. S. Gruen, "The Last Generation of the Roman Republic" (U California Press, 1974)
 F. Millar, The Emperor in the Roman World, (Duckworth, 1977, 1992).
 A. Lintott, "The Constitution of the Roman Republic" (Oxford University Press, 1999)

Primary sources
 Cicero's De Re Publica, Book Two
 Rome at the End of the Punic Wars: An Analysis of the Roman Government; by Polybius

Secondary source material
 Considerations on the Causes of the Greatness of the Romans and their Decline, by Montesquieu
 The Roman Constitution to the Time of Cicero
 What a Terrorist Incident in Ancient Rome Can Teach Us

Constitutions of ancient Rome